Charles Keith Holden (birth registered third ¼ 1937) is a former professional rugby league footballer who played in the 1950s and 1960s.

Background
Keith Holden's birth was registered in Wigan district, Lancashire, England.

Playing career

Wigan
Holden signed for Wigan from Leigh in 1958 for a transfer fee of £6,660 (based on increases in average earnings, this would be approximately £340,000 in 2017). He played in Wigan's victory in the Lancashire County League during the 1958–59 season, and also played left-, i.e. number 4, and scored a try in Wigan's 30-13 victory over Hull F.C. in the 1959 Challenge Cup Final during the 1958–59 season at Wembley Stadium, London on Saturday 9 May 1959, in front of a crowd of 79,811 .

Oldham
After nearly two years at Wigan, Holden moved to Oldham for a transfer fee of £7,000 (based on increases in average earnings, this would be approximately £337,200 in 2017). He made 62 appearances for the club before joining Warrington.

Warrington
Holden made 49 appearances for Warrington, scoring 22 tries.

Return to Wigan
Holden returned to Wigan in 1965, he played left-, i.e. number 4, and scored a try in the 20-16 victory over Hunslet in the 1965 Challenge Cup Final during the 1964–65 season at Wembley Stadium, London on Saturday 8 May 1965, in front of a crowd of 89,016. Holden played left-, i.e. number 4, in Wigan's 16-13 victory over Oldham in the 1966 Lancashire County Cup Final during the 1966–67 season at Station Road, Swinton, on Saturday 29 October 1966. He left Wigan in 1968 and joined Blackpool Borough.

International honours
Keith Holden won a cap for Great Britain while at Warrington in 1963 against Australia.

Genealogical information
Keith Holden is the father of the rugby league  who played in the 1980s for Wigan, and Warrington; Keith Holden Jr.

References

External links
!Great Britain Statistics at englandrl.co.uk (statistics currently missing due to not having appeared for both Great Britain, and England)
Statistics at wigan.rlfans.com

1937 births
Living people
Blackpool Borough players
English rugby league players
Great Britain national rugby league team players
Leigh Leopards players
Oldham R.L.F.C. players
Rugby league players from Wigan
Rugby league centres
Warrington Wolves players
Wigan Warriors players